"Even God Can't Change the Past" is a song by Welsh recording artist Charlotte Church, released as the third single from her fifth studio album Tissues and Issues (2005). Written by Rick Nowels, George O'Dowd, and John Themis, it was produced by David Fortman. Released on December 12th 2005, it peaked at number 17 on the UK Singles Chart, becoming Church's fourth top 20 single.

Background
The song was recorded by Church in early 2005 and was written by Rick Nowels, Boy George from Culture Club, and John Themis. It was produced by David Fortman and mixed by Steve Fitzmaurice, assisted by Stephen Sedgwick. Throughout the song, a piano is being played by David Campbell.

Chart performance
'Even God' was released as a CD single on December 12th 2005 in the United Kingdom under the longer title 'Even God Can't Change the Past'. The song debuted and peaked at number 17 on the UK Singles Chart on December 17th. It lasted seven weeks on the chart and became Church's fourth top 20 single on that chart. It also charted on the Irish Singles Chart, where it peaked at number 38.

Track listing
UK CD 1

UK CD 2

UK iTunes

Charts

References

2005 singles
Charlotte Church songs
Songs written by Rick Nowels
Pop ballads
Songs written by John Themis
Songs written by Boy George
2005 songs